Nusse was an Amt ("collective municipality") in the district of Lauenburg, in Schleswig-Holstein, Germany. Its seat was in Nusse. In January 2008, it was merged with the Amt Sandesneben to form the Amt Sandesneben-Nusse.

The Amt Nusse consisted of the following municipalities (population in 2005 between brackets):

Duvensee (539)
Koberg (733)
Kühsen (378)
Lankau (491)
Nusse (1,027)
Panten (725)
Poggensee (337)
Ritzerau (287)
Walksfelde (188)

Former Ämter in Schleswig-Holstein